Grinder's Switch featuring Garland Jeffreys is the debut album of Garland Jeffreys and Grinder's Switch.  It was released by Vanguard Records (catalog number VSD 6550) in 1970.  The 1970 version issued in France (catalog number VSD 23050) used the name Grinder's Switch.  The CD releases use the name Garland Jeffreys and Grinder's Switch. It was produced by Lewis Merenstein.

Track listing 
All tracks composed by Garland Jeffreys
"Sister Divine" - 4:45
"Father, the Son, and the Holy Ghost" - 3:56
"Won't Ya Come Back Home" - 2:26
"Dear Jolly Jack" - 3:41
"And Don't Be Late" - 2:42
"An Imaginary Invalid" - 4:05
"Last Night I Drove Down to the Bar (Women and Wine)" - 2:09
"Evening" - 1:52
"They Call Me Fortune and Fame" - 2:17
"Seven Sleepers' Den" - 7:40

Personnel 
Grinder's Switch featuring Garland Jeffreys
Garland Jeffreys - lead vocals, acoustic guitar
Ernie Corallo - vocals, acoustic guitar, electric guitar, steel guitar, mandolin
Richard Davis - bass
Sanford Konikoff - drums
Bob Piazza - bass
Stan Szelest - vocals, harmonica, organ, piano
Technical
Neil Schwartz - engineer
Jules Halfant - art direction
Joel Brodsky - cover photography

References

External links 
  — includes review
 

1970 debut albums
Garland Jeffreys albums
Albums produced by Lewis Merenstein
Albums with cover art by Joel Brodsky
Vanguard Records albums